Serena Williams was the defending champion, but withdrew due to injury.

Sabine Lisicki won her maiden WTA tour title, defeating Caroline Wozniacki in the final 6–2, 6–4.

Dinara Safina gained the World No. 1 ranking for the first time at the conclusion of this tournament, despite not participating. This is because Williams' withdrawal, and loss of her championship ranking points, allowed her to be superseded by Safina in the rankings.

Seeds
The top eight seeds receive a bye into the second round.

Draw

Finals

Top half

Section 1

Section 2

Bottom half

Section 3

Section 4

Qualifying

Qualifying seeds

Qualifiers

Qualifying draw

First qualifier

Second qualifier

Third qualifier

Fourth qualifier

Fifth qualifier

Sixth qualifier

Seventh qualifier

Eighth qualifier

External links
 Official results archive (ITF)
 Official results archive (WTA)

Family Circle Cup - Singles
Charleston Open